Central Mosque (Arabic Al-masjid al-markazi المسجد المركزي) may refer to:

Markazi Masjid, Dewsbury
Markazi Masjid, London Borough of Tower Hamlets
Central Mosque Wembley
Central Mosque of Lisbon